US Post Office-Warsaw is a historic post office building located at Warsaw in Wyoming County, New York.  It was designed and built in 1934-1935 as a Works Progress Administration project, and is one of a number of post offices in New York State designed by the Office of the Supervising Architect of the Treasury Department, Louis A. Simon. It is a one-story, five bay steel frame brick structure on a raised reinforced concrete foundation in the Colonial Revival style.

It was listed on the National Register of Historic Places in 1989.

References

External links
US Post Office--Warsaw - Warsaw, New York - U.S. National Register of Historic Places on Waymarking.com

Warsaw
Colonial Revival architecture in New York (state)
Government buildings completed in 1934
Works Progress Administration in New York (state)
Buildings and structures in Wyoming County, New York
National Register of Historic Places in Wyoming County, New York
1934 establishments in New York (state)
Brick buildings and structures